Child Is Father to the Man is the debut album by Blood, Sweat & Tears, released in February 1968. It reached number 47 on Billboard's Pop Albums chart in the United States.

History
As a teenager, Al Kooper went to a concert for jazz trumpeter Maynard Ferguson and this experience inspired Kooper to start a rock band with a horn section. Originally in a band called The Blues Project, Kooper left after band leader Danny Kalb rejected his idea of bringing in a horn section. He then left for the West Coast and found bassist Jim Fielder who believed in the songs that Kooper wrote. Though Kooper had big ideas for his next project, he didn't have the money to bring his ideas to fruition. He then threw a benefit for himself and invited several musicians he previously worked with, such as Judy Collins, Simon & Garfunkel, David Blue, Eric Andersen and Richie Havens. Although the performances sold out, the owner of the Cafe Au Go Go added such numerous expenses to the gross receipts that the net receipts after the performance were not enough to get a plane ticket or a taxi to the airport.

He later called Fielder and convinced him to come to New York. He also asked Bobby Colomby, Anderson and Steve Katz, who was his bandmate in his former band The Blues Project. Colomby called Fred Lipsius and the band placed an ad in The Village Voice for more horn players. Within a month, the band assembled an eight piece which also contained Randy Brecker, Jerry Weiss and Dick Halligan. Kooper then asked John Simon to produce them, after being fresh off from producing Simon & Garfunkel's album Bookends. The album was recorded in two weeks in December 1967. Simon asked all of the members to record their material in one take so he could study songs and make useful suggestions to the arrangements. After a brief promotional tour, Colomby and Katz ousted Kooper from the band, which led to Child is Father to the Man being the only BS&T album on which Kooper ever appeared. The band would later have two number one albums and several Grammys, although Kooper felt they were playing music that he didn't agree with. Despite being asked to leave Blood, Sweat & Tears, Kooper felt everything worked out well for him and the band.

Commercial performance
In the United States Child Is Father to the Man peaked at #47 on Billboard's Pop Albums chart. It failed to generate any Top 40 singles, although "I Love You More Than You'll Ever Know" and "I Can't Quit Her" found some play on progressive rock radio.

In 2012, the album was ranked number 266 on Rolling Stone magazine's list of the 500 greatest albums of all time.

The title is a quotation from a similarly titled poem by Gerard Manley Hopkins, slightly misquoting a poem by William Wordsworth called "My Heart Leaps Up".

The album was re-released in the UK in 1973, entitled "The First Album" on Embassy Records, a subsidiary of Columbia Records (catalogue number EMB 31028) with an identical track listing and the same picture on the front of the sleeve. The rear had new sleeve notes written by English DJ, Noel Edmonds.

Reception
{{Album ratings
| rev1 =AllMusic
| rev1Score = <ref name="AM">{{cite web |first=William  |last=Ruhlman |title= Child Is Father to the Man' > Review |url= |publisher=AllMusic |access-date=July 9, 2011}}</ref>
| rev2      = Rolling Stone
| rev2Score = Positive}}

Writing for AllMusic, critic William Ruhlman wrote of the album:"Al Kooper's finest work, an album on which he moves the folk-blues-rock amalgamation of the Blues Project into even wider pastures, taking in classical and jazz elements (including strings and horns), all without losing the pop essence that makes the hybrid work. This is one of the great albums of the eclectic post-Sgt. Pepper era of the late '60s, a time when you could borrow styles from Greenwich Village contemporary folk to San Francisco acid rock and mix them into what seemed to have the potential to become a new American musical form... This is the sound of a group of virtuosos enjoying itself in the newly open possibilities of pop music. Maybe it couldn't have lasted; anyway, it didn't."

 Track listing 

 Personnel 
Blood, Sweat & Tears
 Al Kooper – organ, piano; lead vocals (tracks 2, 4-7, 9-12); ondioline (track 8)
 Fred Lipsius – piano, alto saxophone
 Randy Brecker – trumpet, flugelhorn
 Jerry Weiss – trumpet, flugelhorn; backing vocals (track 4)
 Dick Halligan – trombone
 Steve Katz – guitars; lead vocals (tracks 3, 8); backing vocals (tracks 3); lute (track 6)
 Jim Fielder – bass guitar, fretless bass guitar
 Bobby Colomby – drums, percussion; backing vocals (tracks 4, 10)

Additional musicians
 Anahid Ajemian – violin
 Fred Catero – sound effects
 Harold Coletta – viola
 Paul Gershman – violin
 Al Gorgoni – organ, guitar, vocals
 Manny Green – violin
 Julie Held – violin
 Doug James – shaker
 Harry Katzman – violin
 Leo Kruczek – violin
 Harry Lookofsky – violin
 Charles McCracken – cello
 Melba Moore – choir, chorus
 Gene Orloff – violin
 Valerie Simpson – choir, chorus
 Alan Schulman – cello
 John Simon – organ, piano, conductor, cowbell
 The Manny Vardi Strings

 Production 
 Producers: Bob Irwin, John Simon
 Engineer: Fred Catero
 Mixing: John Simon
 Mastering: Vic Anesini
 Arrangers: Fred Catero, Al Gorgoni, Fred Lipsius, Alan Schulman, John Simon
 Art direction: Howard Fritzson
 Photography: Bob Cato, Don Hunstein
 Packaging: Michael Cimicata

 Charts 
Album - Billboard (United States)

 Later Samples 
 "I Love You More Than You'll Ever Know"
 "Maria" by Wu-Tang Clan from the album Wu-Tang Forever Covers 
 In 2015, "I Love You More Than You'll Ever Know" performed by Italian singer Luca Ronka in Soul Man'' album
 In 2013, "I Love You More Than You'll Ever Know" on the album Seesaw by Beth Hart & Joe Bonamassa
 In 2008, "I Love You More Than You'll Ever Know" on the album Bad for You Baby by Gary Moore
 In 1973, "I Love You More Than You'll Ever Know" on the album Extension of a Man by Donny Hathaway

References

Blood, Sweat & Tears albums
1968 debut albums
Grammy Hall of Fame Award recipients
Albums produced by John Simon (record producer)
Columbia Records albums
Albums produced by Bob Irwin
Albums conducted by John Simon (record producer)
Jazz-rock